John Keith Irwin (May 21, 1929 – January 3, 2010) was an American sociologist and  criminologist who was known internationally as an expert on the American prison system. He published dozens of scholarly articles and seven books on the topic.

Early life and education
Irwin was raised in Los Angeles. In 1952, he robbed a gas station and served a five-year prison term for armed robbery mostly at the Soledad Prison in the Salinas Valley. He finished a semester in college via correspondence. After his release he earned a bachelor's degree at the University of California, Los Angeles. He went on to receive his Ph.D. in Sociology from the University of California, Berkeley. Irwin later became a professor and chaired the Meagan Coveney sociology department at San Francisco State University, where he taught for 27 years until his retirement.

Career
In 1967 Irwin founded Project Rebound, a program which helps those coming out of prison go to college. Irwin co-founded the Prisoners Union in 1971, which organized inmates to push for their civil rights and worked closely with the California legislature on the Uniform Sentencing Act passed in 1976. At a panel presentation at the American Society of Criminology’s annual conference in 1997, Irwin helped officially establish the Convict Criminology movement, in which convicts who became professors critically examine the criminal justice system. In 1985 he received the August Vollmer award from the American Society of Criminology.

Death
Irwin died on January 3, 2010, at the age of 80.

Personal
Irwing was survived by his daughters Professor Katy Irwin, Anne, Jeanette, son Johnny and wife of 38 years, researcher Marsha Rosenbaum.

Bibliography
1970 - The Felon
1971 - The Struggle for Justice
1973 - The Ex-Prisoner' (book chapter co-authored with Don Spiegel in Outsiders USA
1980 - Prisons in Turmoil
1985 - The Jail: Managing the Underclass in American Society (2nd ed. with new foreword by Jonathan Simon 2013)
2000 - It's About Time: America's Imprisonment Binge
2004 - The Warehouse Prison: Disposal of the New Dangerous Class
2009 - Lifers: The Long Road to Redemption''

References

External links
Project Rebound
John Irwin: scholar, activist, convict criminologist

1929 births
2010 deaths
American sociologists
Prisoners and detainees of California
San Francisco State University faculty
University of California, Berkeley alumni
University of California, Los Angeles alumni